Statistics of Japanese Regional Leagues for the 1974 season.

Champions list

League standings

Kanto

Tokai

Kansai

Chūgoku

Kyushu

1974
Jap
Jap
3